Sergejs Lazovskis (born 19 April 1976) is a Latvian weightlifter. He competed in the men's middle heavyweight event at the 2000 Summer Olympics.

References

1976 births
Living people
Latvian male weightlifters
Olympic weightlifters of Latvia
Weightlifters at the 2000 Summer Olympics
People from Ludza